Johannes Maria Gföllner (17 December 1867, Waizenkirchen - 3 June 1941, Linz) was an Austrian clergyman and bishop for the Roman Catholic Diocese of Linz.

He was ordained in 1883. He was appointed bishop in 1914. He died in 1941.

References 

1867 births
1941 deaths
Austrian Roman Catholic bishops
People from Grieskirchen District